This is a list of the winners of the Bavarian Film Awards Prize for Best Editing.

1990 Peter Przygodda with the movie Last Exit to Brooklyn
1993 Hannes Nikel with the movie Stalingrad
2018 Stephan Krumbiegel with the movie Beuys

References
 
 
 

Bavarian film awards